Sargsyan, also Sarkisian, Sarkissian (in Western Armenian Սարգիսեան) or Sarkisyan, these latter two being transliterations of the Russian spelling Саркисян, is an Armenian surname derived from the given name Sargis.

People bearing this surname include:

Sargsyan
Anna M. Sargsyan (born 2001), Armenian chess master
Ara Sargsian, (1902–1969) Armenian sculptor
Aram Gaspar Sargsyan (born 1949), Armenian politician, a communist and social-democrat activist
Aram Sargsyan (born 1961), Armenian Prime Minister  1999–2000
Aram Sargsyan (singer) (born 1984), Armenian singer-songwriter, comedian and TV personality better known as Aram Mp3
Armen Sargsyan (born 1953), Armenian Prime Minister 1996 to 1997
Arsen Sargsyan (born 1984), Armenian long jumper
Arthur Sargsyan (1968-2017), Armenian handcraft master, activist.
Fadey Sargsyan (1923–2010), Armenian scientist and politician. Chairman of the Council of Ministers of the Armenian Soviet Socialist Republic from 1977 to 1989, later President of the Armenian National Academy of Sciences from 1993 to 2006.
Gabriel Sargsyan (born 1983), Armenian chess player and International Grandmaster of Chess (2002)
Gagik Sargsyan (1926–1998), Armenian historian, academic, vice-president of the Armenian Academy of Sciences
Gevorg Sargsyan (born 1981), Armenian orchestra conductor
Inessa Sargsyan (born 1972), Russian Armenian female volleyball player
Karen Sargsyan (conductor), Armenian choir conductor
Karen Sargsyan (footballer) (born 1983), Russian football player
Narek Sargsyan (born 1958), chief architect of Yerevan
Rita Sargsyan, wife of Armenian President Serzh Sargsyan, First Lady of Armenia
Serzh Sargsyan (born 1954), Armenia Prime Minister (2007–2008) and President (2008–2018)
Shushanna Sargsyan (born 1992), Armenian chess player
Sos Sargsyan (born 1929), Armenian actor, People's Artist of the Soviet Union (1985) and People's Artist of Armenia
Srbuhi Sargsyan (born 1994), Armenian singer known as Srbuk
Tigran Sargsyan (born 1960), Armenian politician and Prime Minister of Armenia (2008-2014)
Vahram Sargsyan (born 1981), Armenian composer and conductor
Vazgen Sargsyan (1959–1999), Armenian military commander, politician and writer, government minister and Prime Minister in 1999
Vigen Sargsyan (born 1975), Armenian Defense Minister
Vladimir Sargsyan (1935–2013) Soviet, Armenian scientist in the field of mechanics

Sargsian
Khoren Sargsian (1891–1970), Armenian writer, critic, doctor of philology, and professor
Sargis Sargsian (born 1973), Armenian former tennis player

Sarkis

Serkis
Andy Serkis, English film actor, director and author of English and Iraqi/Armenian descent was born with an Anglicised version of Sarkisian

Sarkisian
Alex Sarkisian (1922–2004), American football player
Amy Sarkisian (born 1969), artist living and working in Los Angeles, California
Cher (born Cherilyn Sarkisian in 1946), American performer
Mark Sarkisian, American civil engineer
Peter Sarkisian (born 1965), American video and multimedia artist
Steve Sarkisian (born 1974), current University of Texas Longhorns football head coach and former University of Southern California Trojans football head coach
Roza Sarkisian (born 1987), Ukrainian theater director and curator

Sarkissian
Adrian Sarkissian (born 1979), Uruguayan footballer
Alexander Sarkissian (born 1990), American tennis player
Ararat Sarkissian (born 1956), Armenian artist
Armen Sarkissian (born 1953), Armenian politician, ambassador, Prime Minister of Armenia (1996-1997), President of Armenia (2018-) 
Arthur Sarkissian (born 1960), Armenian artist and painter
Karnig Sarkissian, Armenian singer
Ophelia Sarkissian, fictional character in Marvel Comics, better known as Viper or Madame Hydra
Setrak Sarkissian, Lebanese Tabla player

Sarkisyan
Albert Sarkisyan (born 1975), Armenian football player
Albert Sarkisyan (born 1963), Armenian professional football coach and a former player
Nataline Sarkisyan (1990–2007), American teenager with recurrent leukemia
Stepan Sarkisyan (born 1962), former wrestler for the Soviet Union
Yurik Sarkisyan (born 1961), former Olympic weightlifter for the USSR (1980) and Australia
Yuriy Sarkisyan (born 1947), football manager and former player

Sarkeesian
Anita Sarkeesian (born 1983), Canadian-American feminist media critic

Torsarkissian
Serge Torsarkissian, Lebanese Armenian lawyer, politician, Member of Parliament (representing the Armenian Catholic seat in Beirut)

Fictional characters
Margos Sarkissian character of Terminator: The Sarah Connor Chronicles
Janis Sarkisian, a character in the Broadway musical Mean Girls
Ophelia Sarkissian, the alter ego of Viper, a supervillainess in Marvel Comics

Armenian-language surnames
Patronymic surnames
Surnames from given names